Clifford Wells (17 October 1872 – 27 February 1952) was an English first-class cricketer, rugby union player, and educator.

The son of William Lewis Wells, he was born at St Pancras. He was educated at Dulwich College, before matriculating to Jesus College, Cambridge. Clifford was an active sportsman while at Cambridge, playing first-class cricket for Cambridge University Cricket Club in a single match against the Marylebone Cricket Club at Lord's in 1894. He went wicketless in the match and scored 24 runs with the bat. Although he did not progress any further with his cricket after graduating from Cambridge, he did play rugby union for Sussex and Surrey, in addition to playing for the Barbarians. By profession he was a teacher, being employed as an assistant master at Wellington College from 1898 to 1927. Wells, who was married twice during his life, died at his residence at Crowthorne in February 1952. His brothers', Cyril and Lionel, were also first-class cricketers.

References

External links

1872 births
1952 deaths
Alumni of Jesus College, Cambridge
Barbarian F.C. players
Cricketers from Greater London
Cambridge University cricketers
English cricketers
English rugby union players
People from St Pancras, London
People educated at Dulwich College
Rugby union players from London Borough of Camden
Schoolteachers from London
Surrey RFU players